Karl Zittel (21 June 1802, Schmieheim – 28 August 1871, Karlsruhe) was a German theologian, who was a prominent figure in 19th century Liberal Protestantism. He was the father of paleontologist Karl Alfred von Zittel (1839–1904).

He studied theology at the University of Jena, and in 1834 became a pastor in Bahlingen. From 1842 onward, he was a member of the second chamber in the Baden Ständeversammlung, where in September 1845, he made a proposal in favor of Religionsfreiheit (freedom of religion), a motion that gained notoriety at the time. In 1848 he became a pastor in Heidelberg, and during the same year, became a member of the Frankfurt Parliament as a representative of Karlsruhe. 

He was co-founder of the  Protestantenvereins (German Protestant Association), of which, he was a committee member up until his death in 1871. From 1857 to 1865, he was an editor of the popular journal  Der Sonntagabend.

Principal works 
 Zustände der evangelisch-protestantischen Kirche in Baden, 1843 – Conditions of the Evangelical Protestant Church in Baden.
 Motion auf Gestattung einer Religionsfreiheit, 1846 –  Action for clearance of religious freedom.
 Der Bekenntnissstreit in der protestantischen Kirche, 1852 – The commitment dispute in the Protestant church.
 Das Badische Concordat und die Conferenz in Durlach, (with Ludwig Häusser and Daniel Schenkel) 1860 – The Baden Concordat and the Durlach Conference.

References 

1802 births
1871 deaths
People from Ortenaukreis
German Protestant clergy
Members of the Second Chamber of the Diet of the Grand Duchy of Baden
Members of the Frankfurt Parliament
19th-century German Protestant theologians
University of Jena alumni